Schismocarpus is a genus of flowering plants belonging to the family Loasaceae.

Its native range is Southern Mexico.

Species:

Schismocarpus matudae 
Schismocarpus pachypus

References

Loasaceae
Cornales genera